Paul Braniff may refer to:

 Paul Revere Braniff (1897–1954), American airline entrepreneur
 Paul Braniff (hurler) (born 1982), Irish hurler